The Haematobic EP is an EP by Aborted released on May 24, 2004.

The intent of the EP was to serve something of a preview for the group’s then-upcoming fourth album The Archaic Abattoir. Two songs from this EP were reworked and re-recorded for that album.

Track listing

Videos

Personnel
 Sven "Svencho" de Caluwé – vocals
 Bart Vergaert – guitars
 Thijs De Cloedt – guitars
 Frederik Vanmassenhove – bass
 Dirk Vanbueren – drums

References

[ The Haematobic EP (Listenable)] at Allmusic
[ The Haematobic EP (The End)] at Allmusic

Aborted (band) albums
2004 EPs